George Thomas Seward (1851 – March 28, 1904) was a 19th-century professional baseball player and umpire.

In 1876 through 1878, Seward umpired a total of 21 games in the National League. In 1884, he umpired 54 games in the American Association, and 33 games in the Union Association.

External links
, or Retrosheet

St. Louis Brown Stockings (NA) players
New York Mutuals players
St. Louis Brown Stockings (AA) players
1851 births
1904 deaths
Indianapolis Blues (minor league) players
19th-century baseball players